Ali Saad may refer to:

 Ali Saad (actor), Lebanese actor
 Ali Saad (minister) (born 1953), Syrian minister